The Swedish International Development Cooperation Agency is a government agency of the Swedish Ministry for Foreign Affairs.  Sida is responsible for organization of the bulk of Sweden's official development assistance to developing countries. According to the OECD, 2020 official development assistance from Sweden increased 17.1% to US$6.3 billion.

Sida also affirms respect of human rights, democracy and gender equality proclaimed by Universal Declaration of Human Rights on their missions, and together with "Raoul Wallenberg Institute of Human Rights and Humanitarian Law" of Lund University, Sida gave an aide for "Equal State and Human Rights of Women in Southeast Asia" by Asia Pacific Forum held from 9 May and 3 June 2011.

Sida is also informed by the Yogyakarta Principles in Action the working for the rights for LGBTI and Swedish government mandated an "Action plan for Sida's work on sexual orientation and gender identity in international development cooperation 2007-2009". And the evaluation of the 2007–2009 action plan demonstrates the significant work done in many countries on LGBTI issues, including dialogue with civil society, other donors, and governments; inclusion in country strategies; and programme initiatives. As well as directly funding a number of LGBTI groups, Sida headquarters has actively promoted LGBTI issues in its networking with other donors and international stakeholders, and by giving radio and TV interviews, writing a newspaper article, participating in and arranging seminars at pride festivals and the World Outgames, and including LGBTI rights in newly adopted policies.

Research cooperation 
The most long-term development cooperation supported by Sida is its research cooperation, which aims at strengthening research in and by low-income countries, to reduce poverty and build sustainable societies. The work, with a budget of close to 1000 million SEK (2020), is guided by Sweden's strategy for research cooperation and research in development cooperation 2015–2021.

See also
Swedish Workplace HIV/AIDS Programme

References

International Development Cooperation Agency
Sweden, Swedish International Development Cooperation Agency
International Development Cooperation Agency
1995 establishments in Sweden
Government agencies established in 1995